Lamar or Lamarr is a given name. Notable people with the name include:

Lamar Alexander (born 1940), American politician
Lamar Alford (born 1944), American actor and singer
LaMar Baker (1915–2003), American politician and businessman
Lamar Campbell (born 1976), American retired National Football League player
Lamar Campbell (musician) (born 1964), American gospel musician
Lamar Chapman (born 1976), American former National Football League player
Lamar Davis (1921–2014), American National Football League player
Lamar Dodd (1909–1996), American painter
Lamar Fisher, mayor of Pompano Beach, Florida, elected in 2007
Lamar Fontaine (1829–1921), American military veteran, surveyor, poet and author
Lamar Holmes (born 1989), American National Football League player
Lamar Hoover (1887–1944), American college football player and coach
Lamarr Houston (born 1987), American National Football League player
LaMarr Hoyt (born 1955), former Major League Baseball pitcher
Lamar Hunt (1932–2006), American founder of several sports leagues, owner of various teams and sports promoter, member of several sports' halls of fame
Lamar Jackson (born 1997), American football player
Lamar Jackson (cornerback) (born 1998), American football player
Lamar Johnson, American baseball player and coach
Lamar Johnson (actor), Canadian actor and dancer
Lamar King (born 1975), American retired National Football League player
Lamar Lathon (born 1967), American retired National Football League player
Lamar Lemmons, Jr., American politician
Lamar Looney (1871–1935), American politician
Lamar Lundy (1935–2007), American National Football League player
Lamar McGriggs (born 1968), American retired National Football League and Canadian Football League player
Lamar McHan (1932–1998), American National Football League quarterback
Lamar Miller (born 1991), American National Football League player
Lamar Neagle (born 1987), American Major League Soccer player
Lamar Odom (born 1979), American National Basketball Association player
Lamar Patterson (born 1991), American basketball player
Lamar Powell (born 1993), English footballer
Lamar Reynolds (born 1995), English footballer
Lamar Rogers (born 1967), American retired National Football League player
Lamar "Ditney" Smith (1892–1955), American civil rights activist murdered for registering Black people to vote
Lamar Smith (born 1970), American retired National Football League player
Lamar S. Smith (born 1947), American politician
Lamar Stevens (born 1997), American basketball player
Lamar Trotti (1900–1952), American movie screenwriter, producer and executive
Lamar Williams (1949–1983), American musician, bassist for The Allman Brothers Band
LaMarr Woodley (born 1984), American National Football League player

See also
J. Lamar Worzel (1919–2008), American geophysicist
M. Lamar Keene (1936-1996), American self-confessed fraudulent spirit medium
V. Lamar Gudger (1919–2004), American politician

English-language masculine given names